NA-72 Narowal-II is a constituency for the National Assembly of Pakistan. It comprises the Narowal Tehsil and the areas of Bara Manga, Kanjroor, and Dudhu Chak from Shakargarh Tehsil. The Shakargarh areas are taken from the now-abolished Constituency NA-116.

Members of Parliament

2018-2022: NA-78 Narowal-II

Election 2002 

General elections were held on 10 Oct 2002. Riffat Javed of PML-Q won by 49,367 votes.

Election 2008 

General elections were held on 18 Feb 2008. Ahsan Iqbal of PML-N won by 66,633 votes.

Election 2013 

General elections were held on 11 May 2013. Ahsan Iqbal of PML-N won by 95,481 votes and became the  member of National Assembly.

Election 2018 
General elections were held on 25 July 2018.

See also
NA-71 Narowal-I
NA-73 Wazirabad

References

External links 
Election result's official website
Delimitation 2018 official website Election Commission of Pakistan

78
78